West Austintown is an unincorporated community in Mahoning County, in the U.S. state of Ohio.

History
West Austintown had its start in 1869 when the railroad was extended to that point. A post office called West Austintown was established in 1872, and remained in operation until 1929.

References

Unincorporated communities in Mahoning County, Ohio
1869 establishments in Ohio
Populated places established in 1869
Unincorporated communities in Ohio